Gardner Municipal Airport  is a public airport located  southwest of the central business district of Gardner, a city in Worcester County, Massachusetts, United States. This airport is owned by the City of Gardner, and is located in the town of Templeton.

Facilities and aircraft
For 12-month period ending August 1, 2006, the airport had 5,315 aircraft operations, an average of 14 per day: 98% general aviation, 2% military and <1% air taxi. There are 29 aircraft based at this airport: 27 single-engine, 1 multi-engine and 1 ultralight.

References

External links 
 
 

Buildings and structures in Gardner, Massachusetts
Airports in Worcester County, Massachusetts